Lietuvos balsas is a Lithuanian reality talent show that premiered on January 29, 2012 on the LNK. Lietuvos balsas is part of the international syndication The Voice based on the reality singing competition launched in the Netherlands as The Voice of Holland, created by Dutch television producer John de Mol.

Format 
One of the important premises of the show is the quality of the singing talent. Four coaches, themselves popular performing artists, train the talents in their group and occasionally perform with them. Talents are selected in blind auditions, where the coaches cannot see, but only hear the auditioner. The series consists of three phases: a blind audition, a battle phase, and live performance shows. Four judges/coaches, all noteworthy recording artists, choose teams of contestants through a blind audition process. Each judge has the length of the auditioner's performance (about one minute) to decide if he or she wants that singer on his or her team; if two or more judges want the same singer (as happens frequently), the singer has the final choice of coach.
Each team of singers is mentored and developed by its respective coach. In the second stage, called the battle phase, coaches have two of their team members battle against each other directly by singing the same song together, with the coach choosing which team member to advance from each of four individual "battles" into the first live round. Within that first live round, the surviving acts from each team again compete head-to-head, with a combination of public and jury vote deciding who advances onto the next round.
In the final phase, the remaining contestants (top 8) compete against each other in live broadcasts. The television audience and the coaches have equal say 50/50 in deciding who moves on to the final 4 phase. With one team member remaining for each coach, the (final 4) contestants compete against each other in the finale with the outcome decided solely by public vote.

Presenters

Presenters' timeline

 Note
 Skonsmanaitė only presented in the Live Shows phase.

Backstage presenters' timeline

All versions' coaches

Series overview
Warning: the following table presents a significant amount of different colors.

Kids version 
Lietuvos balsas. Vaikai (The Voice of Lithuania. Kids) is the junior version of Lietuvos Balsas and is also broadcast on LNK. The kids' show was confirmed to be in production in June 2018. The first season premiered on 6 January 2019 with Donatas Montvydas, Mantas Jankavičius and Monika Marija (The Voice season 5 winner) as coaches; and Rolandas Mackevičius as host. Filming for the second season began in August 2019. The live shows for this season were held at an empty auditorium due to COVID-19. As of March 2023, season 4 has yet to be confirmed.

Seniors version 
Lietuvos balsas. Senjorai (The Voice of Lithuania. Senior) is the senior version of Lietuvos Balsas, designed exclusive to people of more than 60 years old and is also broadcast on LNK. The senior edition was confirmed to be in production in early January 2019. On June 24, 2019, it was announced that Justinas Jarutis, Inga Jankauskaitė, Monika Marija and Mantas Jankavičius would become coaches for the first season. Rolandas Mackevičius also host the senior's version.

The winner of the first season is Gedeminas Jepšas from team Monika Marija.

Generations version 
In 2021, Lietuvos balsas. Kartos was announced to be broadcast in 2022. This version is "The Voice of Lithuania: Generations", where groups of family members of several ages perform together. Although this version is airing first, the original network of this new idea was Seven Network, owner of the Australian The Voice. In November 2021, a brand new coaching panel was announced: the first-ever trio on the Lithuanian version, 69 Danguje; Ba. lead singer, Benas Aleksandravičius; Ieva Prudnikovaitė; and Vaidas Baumila.

References

External links
Lietuvos balsas Official website

2012 Lithuanian television series debuts
Lithuanian television series
2010s Lithuanian television series
LNK (television station) original programming